Madresfield Court is a country house in Malvern, Worcestershire, England. The home of the Lygon family for nearly six centuries, it has never been sold and has passed only by inheritance since the 12th century; a line of unbroken family ownership reputedly exceeded in length in England only by homes owned by the British Royal Family. The present building is largely a Victorian reconstruction, although the origins of the present house are from the 16th century, and the site has been occupied since Anglo-Saxon times. The novelist Evelyn Waugh was a frequent visitor to the house and based the family of Marchmain, who are central to his novel Brideshead Revisited, on the Lygons. Surrounded by a moat, the Court is a Grade I listed building.

History

Early history: 1086–1746
The origin of the name of the court is Old English, 'maederesfeld', mower's field. Madresfield is not recorded in the Domesday Book but is mentioned in the Westminster Cartulary of 1086 as a possession of Urse d'Abetot (or d'Abitot), Sheriff of Worcestershire. Dorothy Williams, the Lygon family historian, notes that, by 1196, the manor was held by the de Bracy family who retained it for three centuries until the marriage of Joan Bracy to Thomas Lygon in 1419–1420. The marriage between Thomas and the Bracy heiress established the connection between the court and the Lygon family which has continued into the 21st century. Their only son Willam was bequeathed the manor of Madresfield by Joan's mother in 1450 and the house has been the home of the Lygon family since that time. The Lygons were substantial landowners, although minor gentry, until an advantageous marriage between Richard Lygon and Anne Beauchamp, one of three daughters and heirs of Richard Beauchamp, 2nd Baron Beauchamp in the late 15th century. In 1593 Madresfield Court was rebuilt, replacing a 15th-century medieval building.

A less Bleak House: 1747–1865
In 1806, William Lygon was made a baronet and subsequently ennobled as Earl Beauchamp in 1815.
The family's position had been transformed by the death of a distant relative, William Jennens, in 1798. Known as "William the Miser", and "the richest commoner in England", Jennens had amassed a very large fortune through inheritance, stock dealing, property investments and money lending. His death saw his fortune split between three distant relatives, with William Lygon's share equating to some £40 million at 2012 values. The lack of a will saw the estate become subject to one of England's lengthiest court cases, Jennens and Jennens, which ran for over 100 years. The case formed the basis of the suit of Jarndyce and Jarndyce, used as the main plot device by Charles Dickens in his 1852-3 novel, Bleak House.

Hetton recreated: 1866–1919
In 1866, the title and Madresfield passed to Frederick Lygon, his elder brother, and his father, both Henry, having died within three years of each other. Within the year Frederick Lygon pushed forward the major reconstruction of the court begun by his brother, a building programme that continued almost until the 6th earl's death in 1891.

Brideshead Revisited: 1920s–1938
Madresfield was the home of the 7th Earl Beauchamp. Despite a prominent political and social career, the earl's homosexuality was a relatively open secret; Harold Nicolson recorded a dinner at Madresfield where a fellow guest asked incredulously if the earl had just whispered "Je t’adore" to the butler. "Nonsense," Nicolson replied, "he said ‘Shut the door.’" In 1931 the earl was forced abroad following a sexual scandal instigated by his brother-in-law,  the Duke of Westminster, Bendor Grosvenor. Jealous of the earl's "public reputation, his splendid offices and his male heir", Westminster intrigued to bring about Beauchamp's destruction. Following the earl's exile, Evelyn Waugh became a close friend of three of the Beauchamp daughters and a frequent visitor to the house. Waugh had previously been close to Hugh Lygon, Beauchamp's second son, at Oxford. The central family of his novel Brideshead Revisited, the Flytes, are modelled on the Beauchamps. After their father's disgrace, most of Beauchamp's children took his, rather than their mother's side, and a marble bust of the countess was consigned to the moat. Charles Ryder, the narrator in Brideshead Revisited noted "More even than the work of great architects, I loved buildings that grew silently with the centuries, catching and keeping the best of each generation". The historian David Dutton considered that Beauchamp's most lasting legacy was "the assumed portrayal of his family tragedy in Evelyn Waugh's novel Brideshead Revisited".

Documents released by the National Archives in January 2006 showed that emergency plans were made to evacuate Princesses Elizabeth and Margaret to Madresfield in the event of a successful German invasion following the Dunkirk evacuation in 1940. Five years later, Worcestershire County Council's Historic, Environment and Archaeology archive confirmed that the 1940 plan was part of pre-existing 1938 invasion contingency plans. In the event of an invasion breaking out of a likely lodgement in Kent and threatening London, the whole UK government would move to Worcestershire with the Royal family residing at Madresfield.

Modern times: 1939–the present
After the 7th Earl's death in New York in 1938, his son Lord Elmley inherited the court. The atmosphere created by the 8th earl and his Danish wife, Mona, was uncongenial to most of the rest of the family and Mary, Dorothy, and Sibell left the house, none returning for fifty years. Before her death in 1989, Mona, Countess Beauchamp, endowed the Elmley Foundation to support the arts in the counties of Herefordshire and Worcestershire. The house was never opened to the public during her lifetime. 
 
From 1970, Madresfield Court was the home of Rosalind, Lady Morrison, William and Mona's niece and, as of 2012, it is run and lived in by her daughter, Lucy Chenevix-Trench. In 2014, an extensive remodelling of the interior of the house was undertaken by the interior designers Todhunter Earle. Madresfield Court has never been sold or bought in its history, passing by inheritance through the Lygon family, although on three occasions this has been through the female line.

Architecture and description

Exterior
"A moated house of considerable size," the existing building has its origins in the 16th century, the site having been occupied earlier. The Tudor house followed the plan of a standard moated manor. The original bridge and entrance tower are 16th century in origin, although they have been restored. A panel above the gatehouse, which has been moved from its original position, bears the names of Sir William Lygon and his wife, Elizabeth, and the date 1593. The house was extensively restored and rebuilt between 1866 and 1888 by Philip Charles Hardwick for the 5th and 6th earls, creating the current "Victorian fantasy." Hardwick followed his father in developing a large commercial practice, specialising in banking houses, but also undertook a considerable number of country houses, often for his City clients. Notable examples were Aldermaston Court, for D. H. D. Burr, and the now-demolished Addington Park for the then deputy governor of the Bank of England, Lord Addington. Hardwick's connection to Madresfield began with the commission for the Newlands Almshouses in Malvern. As was common for Victorian aristocrats contemplating a rebuilding of their houses, the Beauchamps began with an act of piety. The Lygons being satisfied with the result, Hardwick began a fifteen-year association with the family and the court, which the architectural writer Herminone Hobhouse describes as "characteristic of Hardwick at his best". Although "the principal lines of the old building" were followed, the work became more of a reconstruction than a restoration; only two rooms in the total of over 150 were unaltered. Work was completed c.1890. The original Great Hall, built in the 12th century, stands at the core of this building. The architectural historian Mark Girouard considers Madresfield's internal courtyard to be its most impressive feature.

Interior

The chapel
The chapel was decorated in the Arts and Crafts style by Birmingham Group artists including Henry Payne, William Bidlake and Charles March Gere. The decoration was a 1902 wedding present from Lady Lettice Grosvenor to her bridegroom the 7th Earl, although work on it continued until 1923. Murals on the chapel's walls incorporate images of the couple, as well as their seven children, in scenes rife with Christian symbolism. The critic Jonathan Meades, in the BBC TV series Travels with Pevsner, contrasted the "inviting prose" used by Waugh to describe the chapel at Brideshead with the "prosaic list" written by Nikolaus Pevsner to describe Madresfield's chapel.

The library
The 7th Earl Beauchamp incorporated what had once been the billiard room into the library in order to make it larger and better accommodate its 8,000-volume collection. The Earl chose Charles Robert Ashbee and his Guild of Handicraft to decorate the new room. Ashbee created low-relief carvings of the Tree of Life and the Tree of Knowledge on the ends of two bookcases, and the Earl himself hand-embroidered the Florentine flame-stitch covers that adorn several of the library's chairs, during his years of exile abroad.

The staircase hall
Another change by the 7th Earl was the creation of a dramatic staircase hall out of three smaller rooms in the centre of the house, designed by the architect Randall Wells who had built St Edward's Church, Kempley for him in 1903. The hall rises two stories to a ceiling punctuated by three large, domed skylights. A gallery flanks two sides of the upper level, lined by a railing with balusters of rock crystal quartz. Dozens of portraits, many of them of members of the Lygon family through the centuries, cover the walls. Around the paneling at the top of the four walls is stenciled a quote from Percy Bysshe Shelley's Adonais: "The one remains, the many change and pass; Heaven's light forever shines, Earth's shadows fly; Life, like a dome of many-colour'd glass, Stains the white radiance of eternity; Until Death tramples it to fragments."

Garden and park
The Madresfield estate has its own Grade II* listing.

Ancillary buildings and structures
A number of ancillary buildings and structures have separate Historic England listings. Within the precincts of the court, a late-19th century wellhead is listed Grade II. The North lodge, the South lodge, the lodge cottages near the Home Farm, and the stable block all have their own Grade II listings. At the home farm, the farmhouse itself, the farm gates and gateway, and a dovecote are similarly listed Grade II.

Footnotes

References

Sources

External links

 Madresfield Court Official Website
 National Archive of records ARCHON entry
 Victoria County History

1593 establishments in England
Gardens in Worcestershire
Country houses in Worcestershire
Grade I listed buildings in Worcestershire
Grade I listed houses
Buildings and structures in Malvern, Worcestershire
Historic house museums in Worcestershire
 
Malvern, Worcestershire
Houses with moats